Puiseux-le-Hauberger is a commune in the Oise department in northern France.

See also
Communes of the Oise department

References

Communes of Oise